The 1981 NCAA Division III men's basketball tournament was the seventh annual single-elimination tournament, held during March 1981, to determine the national champions of National Collegiate Athletic Association (NCAA) men's Division III collegiate basketball in the United States.

The tournament field included 32 teams with the national championship rounds contested at Augustana College in Rock Island, Illinois.

SUNY Potsdam defeated hosts Augustana (IL), 67–65 (in overtime), in the championship game to claim their first national title.

Bracket

Regional No. 1

Regional No. 2

Regional No. 3

Regional No. 4

Regional No. 5

Regional No. 6

Regional No. 7

Regional No. 8

National Quarterfinals

See also
1981 NCAA Division I basketball tournament
1981 NCAA Division II basketball tournament
1981 NAIA men's basketball tournament

References

NCAA Division III men's basketball tournament
NCAA Men's Division III Basketball
Ncaa Tournament
NCAA Division III basketball tournament